Uranophora is a genus of moths in the family Erebidae. The genus was erected by Jacob Hübner in 1831.

Species

References

Euchromiina
Moth genera